The South African College of Music, abbreviated as SACM, is a department of the Faculty of Humanities at the University of Cape Town.  It is located on the university's Lower Campus in Rondebosch, Cape Town.

Study opportunities

The South African College of Music offers training in a range of orchestral instruments, piano, voice, African music and jazz. The college boasts several string, wind, jazz and percussion ensembles as well as choirs, a symphony orchestra and a big band. In addition the Opera School annually presents a season of opera performances. All students are required either to play in the orchestras or bands or sing in the choirs, at the discretion of the director.

Students who complete diploma or degree courses are ready to enter the profession of music either as teachers, singers or instrumentalists in Western Classical Music, Jazz Studies or African Music and Dance. Careers open to diplomates and graduates include orchestral playing, opera and oratorio singing, programme compiling for broadcasting networks, librarianship, performance, and education.

The wide range of postgraduate programmes offered includes: ethnomusicology; performance studies in Western classical music, African music and jazz; musicology (theory and history); and composition.

History

The South African College of Music was founded by a group of musicians led by Madame Apolline Niay-Darroll and opened in 1910 in Strand Street, Cape Town, with six students. In 1912 Mr William Henry Bell was appointed Principal and, in 1914, the SACM moved to larger premises in Stal Plein.

In 1920 Mr Bell was made Professor of Music at the University of Cape Town, where he held classes for degree courses. In 1923 the SACM was incorporated into the university and Professor Bell became dean of the Faculty of Music. In 1999 the Faculty of Music was absorbed into the Faculty of Humanities.

Strubenholm, previously the private residence in Rosebank of Henry Struben, has been home to the SACM since 1925. It now houses administrative offices and lecture rooms as well as an exhibition hall for the world-renowned Kirby Collection of African, European and Asian instruments.

Two new buildings, linked to Strubenholm, were completed at the end of 1972. These contain the 160-seat Chisholm Recital Room; an opera studio, the Fiasconaro Room; nearly 100 teaching studios and practising rooms; and the W.H. Bell Music Library, which houses a range of reference and text books, periodicals, scores and records. In addition there are recording and electronic music studios and a listening laboratory.

The 638-seat Concert Hall in the adjacent Baxter Theatre complex, with its outstanding Von Beckerath organ, is an important performing and teaching venue for the SACM.

Notable alumni

 Darryl Andrews
 Cromwell Everson
 Robert Fokkens
 Malcolm Forsyth
 Stefans Grové
 Hendrik Hofmeyr
 John Joubert
 Eddie Kramer
 Galt MacDermot
 Ike Moriz
 Dizu Plaatjies
 Priaulx Rainier
 Judith Sephuma
 Peter van der Merwe
 George Walker
 Martin Watt
 Marcus Wyatt
 Chris Luke
 Pretty Yende
 John Tyrrell (musicologist)

Notable staff

 Erik Chisholm
 Lamar Crowson
 Graham Fitch
 Stanley Glasser
 Peter Klatzow
 Brian Priestman
 Thomas Rajna
 Barry Smith
 Ronald Stevenson
 Arnold van Wyk
 Hubert du Plessis

References

External links
SACM Website
University of Cape Town Website
W. H. Bell Music Library
Baxter Theatre Centre

University of Cape Town
Music schools in South Africa